New York City's 6th City Council district is one of 51 districts in the New York City Council. It is currently represented by Democrat Gale Brewer, who took office in 2022. Brewer previously represented the district from 2002-2013, and served as Borough President of Manhattan in between her two Council stints.

Geography
District 6 is nearly coterminous with Manhattan's Upper West Side, also covering a small section of Hells Kitchen. Central Park, Manhattan's largest park and the most visited urban park in the country, is located in the district, as is the lower half of Riverside Park.

The district overlaps with Manhattan Community Boards 4 and 7, and is contained entirely within New York's 10th congressional district. It also overlaps with the 27th, 29th, 30th, and 31st districts of the New York State Senate, and with the 67th, 69th, and 75th districts of the New York State Assembly.

Recent election results

2021
In 2019, voters in New York City approved Ballot Question 1, which implemented ranked-choice voting in all local elections. Under the new system, voters have the option to rank up to five candidates for every local office. Voters whose first-choice candidates fare poorly will have their votes redistributed to other candidates in their ranking until one candidate surpasses the 50 percent threshold. If one candidate surpasses 50 percent in first-choice votes, then ranked-choice tabulations will not occur.

2017

2013

Previous councilmembers
 Hugh Quinn (1949–1957)
 James Dulligan (1957)
 Eric J. Treulich (1957–1964)
 John J. Santucci (1964–1965)
 David B. Friedland (1965–1976)
 Arlene Stringer (1976–1977)
 Stanley Michels (1977–1991)
 Ronnie Eldridge (1991–2001)
 Gale Brewer (2002–2013)
 Helen Rosenthal (2014–2021)

References

New York City Council districts